Life Chiropractic College West is a private chiropractic school in Hayward, California, US, known for its Doctor of Chiropractic degree program. Founded as Pacific States Chiropractic College in 1976 by George E. Anderson, the name was changed in 1981 to its current form after a merger with Life Chiropractic College (now Life University).

History
Life West traces its roots back to 1976 when it was founded by chiropractor George E. Anderson as Pacific States Chiropractic College. During its first years the school was involved in multiple malfeasance cases resulting in the termination of two administrators. During the early 1980s the school was run by three interim presidents until a merger was agreed between George Anderson, George Wentland, and Sid E. Williams (founder of Life Chiropractic College) to merge Pacific States Chiropractic College with Life College. The result of this merger was the establishment of Life Chiropractic College West in 1981.

Accreditation
The Doctor of Chiropractic Degree Program at Life West has been accredited since 1987 by the Commission on Accreditation of the Council on Chiropractic Education (CCE).

The program is also accredited by the California Board of Chiropractic Examiners.

References

External links
 Official website

Educational institutions established in 1976
Chiropractic schools in the United States
Private universities and colleges in California
Education in Hayward, California
1976 establishments in California